Stamford Shakespeare Company, a registered charity, is an amateur theatre company presenting an annual season of plays in June, July and August at the Rutland Open Air Theatre in the grounds of Tolethorpe Hall, Rutland.

History 

The amateur Stamford Shakespeare Company was founded in 1968 by the late Jean Harley, then Artistic Director, with a performance of A Midsummer Night's Dream in the Monastery Garden of the historic George Hotel in  Stamford, Lincolnshire. It was under the support of the Stamford Arts Centre Committee in aid of the proposed new Arts Centre and restoration of the town's Georgian Theatre. In 1971, the theatre group became independent and was named the "Stamford Shakespeare Company".

Open-air Shakespeare plays continued at the George Hotel until  1976, when the hotel could no longer accommodate the summer open-air theatre because of building work. Tolethorpe Hall came on the market in a near derelict state early in 1977 and was acquired by the Stamford Shakespeare Company with a private loan later repaid. The main interest in the grounds was a natural amphitheatre which was converted into a concrete-stepped 600-seat auditorium covered by a canvas canopy. The first season opened in May 1977 with performances of Macbeth and The Taming of the Shrew.

The hall itself stands on the middle of three terraces cut in sloping ground. The raked auditorium looks outward across the lower terrace which forms the stage behind which, is the open country of the Gwash valley. The Stamford Shakespeare Company presents a three-month season each summer. Normally there are two Shakespeare plays and one by another playwright.

2014 season 
 As You Like It
 Alice in Wonderland & Through the Looking Glass
 The Taming of the Shrew

2015 season 
 Henry V
 Romeo and Juliet
 Tom Jones

2016 season 
 Macbeth
  The Tempest
  The Wind in the Willows

2017 season 
  Much Ado About Nothing
  A Midsummer Night's Dream  
  Hobson's Choice

2018 season 
  The Merchant of Venice 
  The Merry Wives of Windsor 
  The School for Scandal

2019 season 
 Blithe Spirit
 Julius Caesar
 Twelfth Night

2020 season 
 Love's Labour's Lost
 Romeo and Juliet
 The Importance of Being Earnest
 Lord of the Flies

References

External links 

Shakespearean theatre companies
Amateur theatre companies in England
1968 establishments in England
Charities based in Rutland
Culture in Rutland
Tourist attractions in Rutland
Stamford, Lincolnshire